Turbo petholatus (common name: tapestry turban) is a species of sea snail, marine gastropod mollusk in the family Turbinidae.

Description

The length of the shell varies between 30 mm and 100 mm.
The imperforate shell is solid, polished and shining. Its color pattern is rich brown, variously ornamented with dark bands interrupted with white blotches and narrow stripes. The five whorls are flattened beneath the suture, sometimes carinated above. The aperture measures about half the length of the shell. It is circular and pearly within. The peristome and columella are tinged with greenish-yellow,

The circular operculum contains four whorls and a nucleus placed one-third the distance across the face. The outer surface is convex, shining, bright green on the center, the margins brown on one side, white upon the other, slightly granulose about the edges.

Distribution
This species occurs in the Red Sea and in the Indian Ocean off Madagascar, Mozambique, Chagos and Mauritius. It also occurs also in the West Pacific and from Western Australia to southern Queensland.

References

 Smith, M. (1907). A new varietal form of Turbo petholatus, Linn. Bulletin Brooklyn Conchological Club. 1(1): 4-6
 Iredale, T., 1931 29 June..Australian molluscan notes, No. 1 . Rec. Aust. Mus, 18(4):201-235.
 Rosenberg, G. 1992. Encyclopedia of Seashells. Dorset: New York. 224 pp. page(s): 39.
 Wilson, B., 1993. Australian Marine Shells. Prosobranch Gastropods. Kallaroo, WA: Odyssey Publishin.
 Jarrett, A.G. (2000) Marine Shells of the Seychelles. Carole Green Publishing, Cambridge, xiv + 149 pp. NIZT 682
 Alf A. & Kreipl K. (2003). A Conchological Iconography: The Family Turbinidae, Subfamily Turbininae, Genus Turbo. Hackenheim, Germany: Conchbooks.
 Liu, J.Y. [Ruiyu] (ed.). (2008). Checklist of marine biota of China seas. China Science Press. 1267 pp.
 Zuschin, M., Janssen, R. & Baal, C. (2009). Gastropods and their habitats from the northern Red Sea (Egypt: Safaga). Part 1: Patellogastropoda, Vetigastropoda and Cycloneritimorpha. Annalen des Naturhistorischen Museums in Wien 111[A]: 73–158.
 Fowler, O. (2016). Seashells of the Kenya coast. ConchBooks: Harxheim. Pp. 1–170
 Bozzetti L. (2019). Turbo roxas (Gastropoda: Prosobranchia: Turbinidae) nuova specie dalle Filippine meridionali. Malacologia Mostra Mondiale. 104: 24-25
 Dornellas A.P. & Simone L.R.L. (2020). Detailed anatomy of Turbo petholatus Linnaeus, 1758 (Vetigastropoda, Trochoidea, Turbinidae) and its implications for turbinid systematics. Vita Malacologica. 19: 20-29

External links
 
 Linnaeus, C. (1758). Systema Naturae per regna tria naturae, secundum classes, ordines, genera, species, cum characteribus, differentiis, synonymis, locis. Editio decima, reformata (10th revised edition), vol. 1: 824 pp. Laurentius Salvius: Holmiae
 Röding, P. F. (1798). Museum Boltenianum sive Catalogus cimeliorum e tribus regnis naturæ quæ olim collegerat Joa. Fried Bolten, M. D. p. d. per XL. annos proto physicus Hamburgensis. Pars secunda continens Conchylia sive Testacea univalvia, bivalvia & multivalvia. Trapp, Hamburg. viii, 199 pp

petholatus
Gastropods described in 1758
Taxa named by Carl Linnaeus